Felix Ayo Losada (born July 1, 1933, Sestao, Spain) is a Spanish born, naturalised Italian, violinist.

He is renowned as a founder of the Italian ensemble I Musici; as an internationally renowned violinist, who is often a soloist, and is a  performer of chamber music; as a teacher; and as a recording artist with a career that has spanned more than fifty years.

Early career
He was born in Sestao (Spain). He began his musical studies at the Municipal Conservatory of Sestao. He then continued his music studies at the Municipal Conservatory of Bilbao.

Completing his musical studies with honours at 14 years of age, Felix Ayo continued to study in Paris, Siena and Rome. He was a founder of the ensemble I Musici, and remained their first violin soloist for sixteen years. In 1970 he formed the Quartetto Beethoven di Roma, which is generally considered to be one of the best string quartets and piano quartets in existence.

Performances
He has played in the most important theatres of the world: Carnegie Hall, Berliner Philharmonie, Teatro Colón, Musikverein, Teatro Real, La Scala, Sydney Opera House, Concertgebouw, and the Accademia di Santa Cecilia. As a soloist he has played with a number of important symphony orchestras, including those of Madrid, Copenhagen, Buenos Aires, Tokyo, and with the Australian Chamber Orchestra, the Berlin Kammerorchester, the Tokyo String Ensemble, and the Virtuosi di Roma.

Teaching
Ayo has taught at the Accademia Nazionale di Santa Cecilia, and has held master classes in Canada, Australia, the USA, Denmark, Japan, Italy, Spain and Germany, as well as frequently forming part of the jury for international music competitions.

Awards
His recordings have won international recognition, winning many prizes including the Preis der Deutschen Schallplattenkritik, the Edison Prize, the Mar del Plata prize, the Grand Prix du Disque (for his now historic version of Vivaldi's The Four Seasons) and the prize awarded by Italian Record Critics for the Beethoven piano quartets.

Quartetto Beethoven
The Quartetto Beethoven di Roma, with innumerable tours in Europe, Russia, USA, Canada, South America, Australia, New Zealand, Japan, etc., and a continuous presence in international festivals, is one of the finest chamber ensembles in the world.

It consists of: Felix Ayo, violin, Alfonso Ghedin, viola, Mihai Dancila, cello and Carlo Bruno, piano,

The quartet has made many recordings of Piano quartets by Mozart, Beethoven, Schumann, Brahms, Fauré, and many others, and has been awarded the Premio Discografico della Critica Italiana.

Felix Ayo's violin
Ayo plays a G.B. Guadagnini violin made in 1744.

Recordings
Ayo has a vast discography. Some of the works he has been a part of recording are: Bach Brandenburg concertos, Bach violin concertos, Vivaldi violin concerti, Vivaldi Four Seasons, Corelli concerto grossi, Telemann, Albinoni, Tartini, Viotti, Turina, and Granados. Has recorded for several record labels, some of them being: Decca, EMI Classics, Dynamic and Philips.

His participation in recordings include works by Tartini, Viotti, Mendelssohn and Turina.

References

External links
 Homepage
 

1933 births
Living people
Spanish classical violinists
Male classical violinists
Spanish music educators
21st-century classical violinists
21st-century male musicians
Spanish male musicians